Maia Asatiani (born May 4, 1977) is a Georgian TV host. She is hosting the talk-show Profili. She was one of the three judges in Nichieri's first season.

External links

Living people
1977 births
Feminists from Georgia (country)
Television people from Georgia (country)
Place of birth missing (living people)
21st-century women from Georgia (country)